Yashwantrao Gadakh Patil (born 12 May 1943, Nifad in Ahmednagar district (Maharashtra) is a veteran leader of Nationalist Congress Party from Maharashtra. He served as member of the Lok Sabha representing Ahmednagar (Lok Sabha constituency). He was elected to 8th, 9th and 10th Lok Sabha.

References

People from Nashik district
1943 births
Living people
Indian National Congress politicians 
India MPs 1991–1996
India MPs 1989–1991
India MPs 1984–1989
People from Ahmednagar district
Lok Sabha members from Maharashtra
Maharashtra district councillors